José Acasuso was the defending champion, but chose not to participate this year.

Luis Horna won the title, defeating Nicolás Massú in the final, 7–5, 6–3.

Seeds

 Fernando González (quarterfinals)
 Gastón Gaudio (round robin, withdrew because of a left thigh injury)
 Nicolás Massú (final)
 Rubén Ramírez Hidalgo (round robin)
 Luis Horna (champion)
 Sergio Roitman (quarterfinals, retired because of an abductor injury)
 Albert Montañés (semifinals)
 Martín Vassallo Argüello (semifinals)

Draw

Finals

Round robin

Qualifying

Seeds

 Albert Portas (qualified)
 Óscar Hernández (qualified)
 Flávio Saretta (first round)
 Juan Pablo Guzmán (qualified)
 André Sá (first round)
 Diego Junqueira (qualifying competition, lucky loser)

Qualifiers

Lucky loser
  Diego Junqueira

Qualifying draw

First qualifier

Second qualifier

Third qualifier

External links
 Main draw
 Qualifying draw

Singles